The 2018 World Short Track Speed Skating Championships were the 43rd World Short Track Speed Skating Championships and held from 16 to 18 March 2018 in Montreal, Canada.

Medal summary

Medal table

Men

Women

References

External links
Official website
Results book

2018
World Short Track Championships
International speed skating competitions hosted by Canada
2018 World Short Track Championships
World Short Track Championships
World Short Track
2010s in Montreal
2018 in Quebec